Mount Kunyit ("Turmeric Mountain"; also known as Bukit Belerang) is a fumarolic stratovolcano on Talang Kemuning Village, Gunung Raya District, Kerinci Regency, Jambi, Sumatra, Indonesia. The summit contains two craters; the uppermost is a crater lake.

See also 

 List of volcanoes in Indonesia

References 

Kunyit
Kunyit
Kunyit
Kunyit
Pleistocene stratovolcanoes